Vincenzo Balzani (born 15 November 1936 in Forlimpopoli, Italy) is an Italian chemist, now emeritus professor at the University of Bologna.

Career 
He has spent most of his professional life at the “Giacomo Ciamician” Department of Chemistry of the University of Bologna, becoming full professor in 1973. He has been appointed emeritus professor on November 1, 2010.

Teaching activity 
He taught courses on General and Inorganic Chemistry, Photochemistry, Supramolecular chemistry. He was chairman of the PhD course on Chemical Sciences from 2002 to 2007 and of the “laurea specialistica” in Photochemistry and Material Chemistry from 2004 to 2007. In the Academic Year 2008-2009 he founded at the University of Bologna an interdisciplinary course on Science and Society.

Scientific activity 
He has carried out an intense scientific activity in the fields of photochemistry, photophysics, electron transfer reactions, supramolecular chemistry, nanotechnology, machines and devices at the molecular level, photochemical conversion of solar energy. With its 650 publications cited more than 64,000 times in the scientific literature (H index 119), he is one of the best known chemists in the world. He is author or co-author of texts for researchers in English, some translated into Chinese and Japanese, which are currently adopted in universities in many countries. A few of the most significant texts are: Photochemistry of Coordination Compounds (1970), Supramolecular Photochemistry (1991), Molecular Devices and Machines - Concepts and Perspectives for the Nanoworld (2008), Energy for a Sustainable World (2011), Photochemistry and Photophysics: Concepts, Research, Applications (2014).

Public education activity 
For many years, alongside scientific research, he has carried out an intense dissemination activity, also on the relationship between science and society and between science and peace, with particular reference to energy and resource issues. He is convinced that scientists have a great responsibility that derives from their knowledge and therefore it is their duty to actively contribute to solving the problems of humanity, particularly those connected to the current energy-climate crisis. Every year he holds dozens of seminars in primary or secondary schools and public conferences to illustrate to students and citizens the problems created by the use of fossil fuels: climate change, ecological unsustainability and the social unease deriving from growing inequalities. He believes that three transitions are necessary: from fossil fuels to renewable energies, from the linear economy to the circular economy and from consumerism to sobriety. On these themes he is coauthor of books much appreciated by students and teachers of secondary schools: Chimica (2000); Energia oggi e domani: Prospettive, sfide, speranze (2004); Energia per l'astronave Terra (2017), whose first edition (2007) won the Galileo award for scientific dissemination; Chimica! Leggere e scrivere il libro della natura (2012), english version: Chemistry! Reading and writing the book of Nature (2014); Energia, risorse, ambiente (2014); Le macchine molecolari (2018), finalist in the National Award for Scientific Dissemination Giancarlo Dosi.

Other activities 
Visiting professor: University of British Columbia, Vancouver, Canada 1972; Energy Research Center, Hebrew University of Jerusalem, Israel, 1979; University of Strasbourg, France, 1990; University of Leuven, Belgium, 1991; University of Bordeaux, France, 1994.
Chairman: Gruppo Italiano di Fotochimica (1982-1986), European Photochemistry Association (1988-92); XII IUPAC Symposium on Photochemistry (1988); International Symposium on "Photochemistry and Photophysics of Coordination Compounds (since 1989, now Honorary Chairman); PhD course in Chemistry Sciences (2002-2007) e Laurea specialistica in  Photochemistry and Chemistry of Materials (2004-2007), University of Bologna.

Director: Institute of Photochemistry and High Energy Radiations (FRAE), National Research Council (Italy), Bologna (1977-1988) and Center for the Photochemical Conversion of Solar Energy, University of Bologna (1981-1998). 
Member of the Scientific Committee of several  international scientific journals. 
Member of the Scientific Committee of the Urban Plan for Sustainable Mobility (PUMS), of the Bologna metropolitan area (2008-)

Political activity: In 2009 he started the Science and Society interdisciplinary course at the University of Bologna with the aim of bridging the gap between University and City; it has long been hoping for the strengthening of similar initiatives for the cultural growth of the Metropolitan City. In 2014 he founded the Energia per l'Italia group, formed by 22 professors and researchers of the University and of the most important research centers of Bologna, with the aim of offering the Government and local politicians guidelines to tackle the energy problem according to a broad perspective that includes scientific, social, environmental and cultural aspects.

Coordinator and editor: Supramolecular Photochemistry, NATO ASI Series n. 214, Reidel, Dordrecht (1987); Supramolecular Chemistry, NATO ASI Series n. 371, Reidel, Dordrecht (1992) (with L. De Cola); Guest Editor, Supramolecular Photochemistry, New J. Chem., N.7-8, vol. 20 (1996); Editor in chief of the Handbook on Electron Transfer in Chemistry, in five volumes, Wiley-VCH,
Weinheim (2001); Topics in Current Chemistry, volumes 280 and 281 on Photochemistry and
Photophysics of Coordination Compounds (2007).

Associations and academies 
He is a member of: Società Chimica Italiana; Accademia delle Scienze di Bologna; Accademia delle Scienze di Torino; Società Nazionale di Scienze, Lettere ed Arti in Napoli; Accademia Nazionale delle Scienze detta dei XL; Accademia Nazionale dei Lincei; European Photochemistry Association; ChemPubSoc Europe; Academia Europaea; European Academy of Sciences, European Academy of Sciences and Arts; American Association for the Advancement of Science.

Honors and awards 
Pacific West Coast Inorganic Lectureship, USA and Canada, 1985; Gold Medal "S. Cannizzaro", Italian Chemical Society, 1988; Doctorate "Honoris Causa", University of Fribourg (CH), 1989; Accademia dei Lincei Award in Chemistry, Italy, 1992; Ziegler-Natta Lecturer, Gesellschaft Deutscher Chemiker, Germany, 1994; Italgas European Prize for Research and Innovation, 1994; Centenary Lecturer, The Royal Chemical Society (U.K.), 1995; Porter Medal for Photochemistry, 2000; Prix Franco-Italien de la Société Française de Chimie, 2002; Grande Ufficiale dell’Ordine al Merito della Repubblica Italiana, 2006; Quilico Gold Metal, Organic Division, Italian Chemical Society, 2008; Honor Professor, East China University of Science and Technology of Shanghai, 2009; Blaise Pascal Medal, European Academy of Sciences, 2009; Rotary Club Galileo International Prize for scientific research, 2011; Nature Award for Mentoring in Science, 2013; Archiginnasio d’oro, Città di Bologna, 2016; Grand Prix de la Maison de la Chimie (France) 2016; Leonardo da Vinci Award, European Academy of Sciences, 2017; Nicholas J. Turro Award, Inter-American Photochemical Society, 2018; Cavaliere di Gran Croce della Repubblica Italiana per meriti scientifici, 2019; Primo Levi Award, Gesellschaft Deutscher Chemiker and Società Chimica Italiana, 2019; UNESCO-Russia Mendeleev Prize, 2021.

Publications

Scientific books 
 
 
  Translated into Chinese and Japanese.
  Translated into Chinese.
  Translated into Chinese.
 
  Translated into Chinese

Educational books (in Italian)

Some important papers in scientific journals

References

External links 
Homepage at the University of Bologna. Accessed 2011-07-19.
 CV, Accessed 2015-09-06.
 List of publications, Accessed 2015-09-06.

1936 births
20th-century Italian chemists
Living people
Academic staff of the University of Bologna
National Research Council (Italy) people
Photochemists